"Lullaby" is a song by British rapper Professor Green. It is a hip hop and pop song that features vocals from American singer Tori Kelly. It was released on 14 September 2014 as the lead single from Green's third studio album, Growing Up in Public.

Background
The song was written about Manderson's late grandmother, who died when he was 13 years old. The song premiered on air on Nick Grimshaw's BBC Radio 1 show on 28 July 2014, but was played live first at Leicester Music Festival at Welford Road Stadium on 25 July 2014.

Music video
A music video was produced for the song. It features both Green and Kelly. The video echoes the loss of his grandmother; it shows a young boy growing up with his grandfather who becomes unwell and dies. It shows each moment the boy spends with his grandfather when he is younger and flicks it forward in time. It shows the boy with his girlfriend who runs to tell the boy about his grandfather. The boys grandfather dies and at the end and shows how the boy copes. Halfway through the video the boy is lying in bed remembering his grandfather, quite like Professor Green did with his grandmother.

Track listing

Charts

Certifications

References

2014 singles
2014 songs
Professor Green songs
Songs written by Ina Wroldsen
Songs written by Professor Green
Virgin Records singles
Tori Kelly songs
Songs written by Chris Loco